USS Achigan (YT/YTB-218) was a Cahto-class large harbor tug in the service of the United States Navy. A French-Canadian rendering of the word ashigan which, in Chippewa and Algonquian dialects, is the name of the smallmouth bass.

Construction
Achigan (YT-218) was laid down on 23 July 1943, at Ipswich, Massachusetts, by W. A. Robinson, Inc.; reclassified a large harbor tug YTB-218 on 15 May 1944; launched on 4 October 1944; and placed in service on 9 January 1945.

Service history
Assigned to the 4th Naval District, Achigan spent most of her naval career at the Philadelphia Naval Shipyard. Later salvaged, the tug returned to service at Philadelphia, in mid-1947. Achigan served there until the summer of 1956, when she was transferred to the 6th Naval District. The meager record of her service indicates that the tug served in the 6th Naval District into 1957, and was disposed of later that year.

References

Bibliography

 
 

 

Tugs of the United States Navy
Ships built in Ipswich, Massachusetts
1944 ships